This is a list of Y-League records and statistics

Club honours

Champions
This is a list of Y-League champions, that is, all the clubs that have won the grand final of the Y-League or finished top of the table as "champions". The winning team is crowned as the Y-League Champion.

Premiers
This is list of Y-League premiers, that is, all the teams that have won the minor premiership of the Y-League. The team which finishes first on the table at the completion of the regular season is crowned Y-League Premiers.

The numbers in brackets indicate the number of premierships won by a team.

Summary

Individual honours

Player of the Year

Golden Boot

League milestones

Club records

Titles
Most Premiership titles: 4, Sydney FC
Most Championship titles: 4, Sydney FC
Most consecutive Premiership title wins: 2, Sydney FC (2016, 2017), Melbourne City (2017, 2018), Western Sydney Wanderers (2018, 2019)
 Most consecutive Championship title wins: 2, Gold Coast United (2010, 2011)

References

Y-League
Association football league records and statistics